Arizona Sur is a 2006 Argentine comedy film directed and produced by Daniel Pensa and Miguel Angel Rocca and written by Alan Pauls. The film stars Nazareno Casero, Daniel Freire and Alejandro Awada and premiered on 18 January 2007 in Buenos Aires.

Synopsis 
A pregnant 70-year-old woman falls into a coma. Her two sons decide to hunt down the man who impregnated her. In this journey the younger of the two brothers makes some observations and has some wild experiences. He  discovers that he himself is the son of the absconding father of his would-be sibling. To his astonishment and curiosity he also discovers the gift that this father gives to all his sons: webbed toes. The younger brother, meanwhile, meets an angelic girl and is molested in a betting-house. After that, things get even stranger for the two of them.

Cast 
 Nazareno Casero
 Daniel Freire
 Alejandro Awada
 Beatriz Thibaudin
 Marina Glezer
 Christina Banegas
 Carlos Kaspar
 Tito Gómez
 Fernando Llosa ... Mecánico
 María Onetto ... Patrona
 Ruben Surace ... Místico
 Silvia Trawier ... Dueña de hotel
 Alberto Vázquez ... Patrick

References

External links 
 
 World cinema

2006 films
2000s comedy road movies
2000s Spanish-language films
Argentine comedy films
2006 comedy films
2000s Argentine films